Andrea Di Corrado (born August 13, 1988, in Ponte San Pietro) is an Italian cyclist.

Palmares
2012
1st stage 5 Tour of Turkey
2013
3rd Tour du Limousin

References 

1988 births
Living people
Italian male cyclists
People from Ponte San Pietro
Cyclists from the Province of Bergamo